Quinney is an unincorporated community in the town of Stockbridge, Calumet County, Wisconsin, United States. It is located along Wisconsin Highway 55 approximately one mile (1 km) north of its southern terminus. The Military Ridge Road ran through the community. Quinney was named for Austin E. and John W. Quinney who were two Mohican brothers who led a group of settlers from New York in the 1820s.

Notes

Unincorporated communities in Calumet County, Wisconsin
Unincorporated communities in Wisconsin